The Eparchy of Saints Peter and Paul of Melbourne is a Ukrainian Greek Catholic Church ecclesiastical territory or eparchy of the Catholic Church in Australia. Headquartered in Melbourne, it is a suffragan in the ecclesiastical province of the metropolitan Archbishop of Melbourne, a Latin Church territory.

The Cathedral of Saints Peter and Paul, in North Melbourne, Victoria, is the episcopal church of the eparch, currently Mykola Bychok CSSR.

Status and jurisdiction 
Like all Catholic dioceses in Australia, the eparchy is a member of the Australian Catholic Bishops' Conference. The Catholic Church is made up of the Latin or Western Catholic church and 21 Eastern Catholic particular churches sui iuris, one of which is the Ukrainian Greek Catholic Church.
 
The eparchy is non-geographic, but demographic in that it has jurisdiction wherever Ukrainian Greeks are found in Australia, New Zealand and throughout Oceania. It has 21 churches and more schools, nursing homes and other institutions in Australia and New Zealand.

History 
The eparchy began on 10 May 1958 as the apostolic exarchate for Ukrainians of the Byzantine Rite in Australia, New Zealand and Oceania. (Apostolic exarchs, like apostolic visitors, are "exempt", that is, they are responsible to the Holy Roman See. They are usually in missionary areas where the ordinary infrastructure of eparchies or dioceses is scanty.)

The exarchate was superseded on 24 June 1982 by its becoming the eparchy (that is, diocese) of Melbourne. Since there was already an Archbishopric of Melbourne, and it is not customary to have two bishops with identically named sees, the exarchate is described as "the Eparchy of Saints Peter & Paul of Melbourne" and is notionally a suffragan see of the (Latin) Archdiocese of Melbourne.

Parishes

Australia 
 In Victoria, parishes are located in North Melbourne (Ukrainian Catholic Cathedral of Saints Peter and Paul), Wodonga (Church of St Olha), Ardeer (The Dormition of the Blessed Virgin), Geelong (Protection of the Mother of God) and Noble Park (Mission of Blessed Mykolay Charnetsky).
 In New South Wales, parishes are located in Lidcombe (St Andrew's Church), Wollongong (St Volodymyr's), Adamstown (Protection of the Mother of God), and Queanbeyan (St Michael's).
 In the Australian Capital Territory, a parish is located in Lyneham (Church of St Volodymyr).
 In South Australia, parishes are located in Wayville (Protection of the Mother of God) and Woodville (Saints Volodymyr and Olha War Memorial Church).
 In Queensland, a parish is located in Woolloongabba (Protection of the Mother of God).
 In Western Australia, parishes are located in Maylands (St John the Baptist) and Northam (Church of the Nativity of the Blessed Virgin).
 In Tasmania, parishes are located in Hobart (The Transfiguration of our Lord) and Launceston (Holy Family Church)

New Zealand 
Church services are held in 
 Auckland (Mother of Perpetual Help Church).
 Christchurch (St Peter's Church)
 Wellington (Sacred Heart Cathedral chapel)

Eparchial bishops 
The following individuals have been appointed apostolic exarch and/or elected as Ukrainian Eparch of Saints Peter and Paul of Melbourne:
{| class="wikitable"
!Order
!Name
!Title
!Date enthroned
!Reign ended
!Term of office
!Reason for term end
|-
|rowspan=2 align="center"| ||rowspan=2 |Ivan Prasko †||Apostolic Exarch of Australia (Ukrainian) ||align="center" |10 May 1958 ||align="center" |24 June 1982 ||align="right" | ||Elevated as Bishop of Ss Peter & Paul of Melbourne
|-
|Eparch (Bishop) of Ss Peter & Paul of Melbourne (Ukrainian), titular bishop of Zygris ||align="center" |24 June 1982 ||align="center" |16 December 1992 ||align="right" | ||Retired 
|-
|align="center"| ||Peter Stasiuk C.Ss.R. ||Eparch of Ss Peter & Paul of Melbourne ||align="center" |16 December 1992 ||align="center" |15 January 2020 ||align="right" | ||Retired
|-
|align="center"| ||Mykola Bychok C.Ss.R.||Eparch of Ss Peter & Paul of Melbourne ||align="center" |15 January 2020  ||align="center" |Present ||align="right" | ||
|}

See also 

 Roman Catholicism in Australia
 Ukrainian Greek Catholic Church

References

External links 
 Official website
 GigaCatholic with incumbent biography links

Melbourne
Saints Peter and Paul of Melbourne, Ukrainian Catholic Diocese of
Ukrainian diaspora in Australia
Christian organizations established in 1958
1958 establishments in Australia